Andrew Stone (born 6 January 1983) is a Zimbabwean cricketer. He played one first-class match for CFX Academy cricket team in 1999/00.

References

External links
 

1983 births
Living people
Zimbabwean cricketers
CFX Academy cricketers
Sportspeople from Harare